A quarter tone is a pitch halfway between the usual notes of a chromatic scale or an interval about half as wide (aurally, or logarithmically) as a semitone, which itself is half a whole tone. Quarter tones divide the octave by 50 cents each, and have 24 different pitches.

Quarter tone has its roots in the music of the Middle East and more specifically in Persian traditional music. However, the first evidenced proposal of quarter tones, or the quarter-tone scale (24 equal temperament), was made by 19th-century music theorists Heinrich Richter in 1823 and Mikhail Mishaqa about 1840. Composers who have written music using this scale include: Pierre Boulez, Julián Carrillo, Mildred Couper, George Enescu, Alberto Ginastera, Gérard Grisey, Alois Hába, Ljubica Marić, Charles Ives, Tristan Murail, Krzysztof Penderecki, Giacinto Scelsi, Ammar El Sherei, Karlheinz Stockhausen, Tui St. George Tucker, Ivan Wyschnegradsky, and Iannis Xenakis. (See List of quarter tone pieces.)

Types

Equal-tempered tuning systems

The term quarter tone can refer to a number of different intervals, all very close in size. For example, some 17th- and 18th-century theorists used the term to describe the distance between a sharp and enharmonically distinct flat in mean-tone temperaments (e.g., D–E). In this scale the quarter tone is the smallest step. A semitone is thus made of two steps, and three steps make a three-quarter tone or neutral second, half of a minor third. The 8-TET scale is composed of three-quarter tones. Four steps make a whole tone.

Quarter tones and intervals close to them also occur in a number of other equally tempered tuning systems. 22-TET contains an interval of 54.55 cents, slightly wider than a quarter-tone, whereas 53-TET has an interval of 45.28 cents, slightly smaller. 72-TET also has equally tempered quarter-tones, and indeed contains three quarter-tone scales, since 72 is divisible by 24. The smallest interval in 31 equal temperament (the "diesis" of 38.71 cents) is half a chromatic semitone, one-third of a diatonic semitone and one-fifth of a whole tone, so it may function as a quarter tone, a fifth-tone or a sixth-tone.

Just intonation tuning systems
In just intonation the quarter tone can be represented by the septimal quarter tone, 36:35 (48.77 cents), or by the undecimal quarter tone (i.e. the thirty-third harmonic), 33:32 (53.27 cents), approximately half the semitone of 16:15 or 25:24. The ratio of 36:35 is only 1.23 cents narrower than a 24-TET quarter tone. This just ratio is also the difference between a minor third (6:5) and septimal minor third (7:6).

Composer Ben Johnston, to accommodate the just septimal quarter tone, uses a small "7" as an accidental to indicate a note is lowered 49 cents, or an upside down "7" to indicate a note is raised 49 cents, or a ratio of 36:35. Johnston uses an upward and downward arrow to indicate a note is raised or lowered by a ratio of 33:32, or 53 cents.

Playing quarter tones 

Any tunable musical instrument can be used to perform quarter tones, if two players and two identical instruments, with one tuned a quarter tone higher, are used. As this requires neither a special instrument nor special techniques, much quarter toned music is written for pairs of pianos, violins, harps, etc. The retuning of the instrument, and then returning it to its former pitch, is easy for violins, harder for harps, and slow and relatively expensive for pianos.

The following deals with the ability of single instruments to produce quarter tones. In Western instruments, this means "in addition to the usual 12-tone system". Because many musical instruments manufactured today (2018) are designed for the 12-tone scale, not all are usable for playing quarter tones. Sometimes special playing techniques must be used.

Conventional musical instruments that cannot play quarter tones (except by using special techniques—see below) include:
 Most standard or unmodified non-electronic keyboard instruments, such as pianos, organs, and accordions
 Fretted string instruments such as guitars, bass guitars, and ukuleles (though on these it is possible to play quarter tones by pitch-bending, with special tunings, or with customized necks)
 Pitched percussion instruments, if standard techniques are used, and if the instruments are not tunable
 Western wind instruments that use keys or valves
 Woodwind instruments, such as clarinets, saxophones, flutes, and oboes (though with many of these, it is still possible using non-standard techniques such as special fingerings or by the player manipulating their embouchure, to play at least some quarter tones, if not a whole scale)
 Valved brass instruments (trumpet, tuba) (though, as with woodwinds, embouchure manipulation, as well as harmonic tones that fall closer to quarter-tones than half-tones, make quarter-tone scales possible; the horn technique of adjusting pitch with the right hand in the bell makes this instrument an exception)
 Harmonica (although note bending is a common technique)

Conventional musical instruments that can play quarter tones include
 Electronic instruments:
 Synthesizers, using either special keyboard controllers or continuous-pitch controllers such as fingerboard controllers, or when controlled by a sequencer capable of outputting quarter-tone control signals.
 Theremins and other continuously pitched instruments
 Fretless string instruments, such as the violin family, fretless guitars, fretless electric basses, ouds, and members of the huqin family of instruments.
 String instruments with movable frets (such as the sitar)
 Specially fretted string instruments (such as the Turkish bağlama).
 Fretted string instruments specially tuned to quarter tones
 Pedal steel guitar
 Wind instruments whose main means of tone-control is a slide, such as trombones, the tromboon invented by P. D. Q. Bach, the slide trumpet and the slide whistle
 Specially keyed woodwind instruments. A quarter tone clarinet was built by Fritz Schüller (1883–1977) of Markneukirchen, and a quarter tone mechanism for flutes by Eva Kingma.
 Valved brass instruments with extra, quarter-tone valves, and natural brass instruments that play through the 11th and 13th partials of the harmonic series
 Voice
 Kazoo
 Pitched percussion instruments, when tuning permits (e.g., timpani), or using special techniques

Other instruments can be used to play quarter tones when using audio signal processing effects such as pitch shifting.

Quarter-tone pianos have been built, which consist essentially of two pianos with two keyboards stacked one above the other in a single case, one tuned a quarter tone higher than the other.

Music of the Middle East 

Many Persian dastgah and Arabic maqamat contain intervals of three-quarter tone size; a short list of these follows.

Bayati: D E F G A B C D

Rast:
C D E F G A B C (ascending)
C B A G F E D C (descending)

Saba: D E F G A B C D

Sigah: E F G A B C D E

‘Ajam
Hoseyni

The Islamic philosopher and scientist Al-Farabi described a number of intervals in his work in music, including a number of quarter tones.

Assyrian/Syriac Church Music Scale:
 Qadmoyo (Bayati)
 Trayono (Hussayni)
 Tlithoyo (Segah)
 Rbiʿoyo (Rast)
 Hmishoyo
 Shtithoyo (ʿAjam)
 Shbiʿoyo
 Tminoyo

Quarter-tone scale 
Known as gadwal in Arabic, the quarter-tone scale was developed in the Middle East in the eighteenth century and many of the first detailed writings in the nineteenth century Syria describe the scale as being of 24 equal tones. The invention of the scale is attributed to Mikhail Mishaqa whose work Essay on the Art of Music for the Emir Shihāb (al-Risāla al-shihābiyya fi 'l-ṣināʿa al-mūsīqiyya) is devoted to the topic but also makes clear his teacher Sheikh Muhammad al-Attar (1764–1828) was one of many already familiar with the concept.

The quarter tone scale may be primarily a theoretical construct in Arabic music. The quarter tone gives musicians a "conceptual map" they can use to discuss and compare intervals by number of quarter tones, and this may be one of the reasons it accompanies a renewed interest in theory, with instruction in music theory a mainstream requirement since that period.

Previously, pitches of a mode were chosen from a scale consisting of seventeen tones, developed by Safi al-Din al-Urmawi in the thirteenth century.

Composer Charles Ives chose the chord C–D–F–G–B as good possibility for a "secondary" chord in the quarter-tone scale, akin to the minor chord of traditional tonality. He considered that it may be built upon any degree of the quarter tone scale Here is the secondary "minor" and its "first inversion":

In popular music 
The bass descent of Nancy Sinatra's version of "These Boots Are Made for Walkin' " includes quarter tone descents. Several quarter-tone albums have been recorded by Jute Gyte, a one-man avantgarde black metal band from Missouri, USA. Another quartertone metal album was issued by the Swedish band Massive Audio Nerve. Australian psychedelic rock band King Gizzard & the Lizard Wizard's album Flying Microtonal Banana heavily emphasizes quarter-tones and used a custom-built guitar in 24-TET tuning. Jazz violinist/violist Mat Maneri, in conjunction with his father Joe Maneri, made a crossover fusion album, Pentagon (2005), that featured experiments in hip hop with quarter tone pianos, as well as electric organ and mellotron textures, along with distorted trombone, in a post-Bitches Brew type of mixed Jazz/rock.

Ancient Greek tetrachords 

The enharmonic genus of the Greek tetrachord consisted of a ditone or an approximate major third, and a semitone, which was divided into two microtones. Aristoxenos, Didymos and others presented the semitone as being divided into two approximate quarter tone intervals of about the same size, while other ancient Greek theorists described the microtones resulting from dividing the semitone of the enharmonic genus as unequal in size (i.e., one smaller than a quarter tone and one larger).

Interval size in equal temperament 
Here are the sizes of some common intervals in a 24-note equally tempered scale, with the interval names proposed by Alois Hába (neutral third, etc.) and Ivan Wyschnegradsky (major fourth, etc.):

Moving from 12-TET to 24-TET allows the better approximation of a number of intervals. Intervals matched particularly closely include the neutral second, neutral third, and (11:8) ratio, or the 11th harmonic. The septimal minor third and septimal major third are approximated rather poorly; the (13:10) and (15:13) ratios, involving the 13th harmonic, are matched very closely. Overall, 24-TET can be viewed as matching the 11th and 13th harmonics more closely than the 7th.

See also 
 Musical temperament
 List of quarter tone pieces
 List of meantone intervals

References

Further reading 

Bartolozzi, Bruno (1967). New Sounds for Woodwind. London, New York: Oxford University Press.
Bousted, Donald (2002). "Microtonality, the Recorder and the Quarter-Tone Recorder Manual". The Recorder Magazine 22, no. 3 (Fall): 99–102.
Bousted, Donald (2005). "Next Step Quarter-Tone Resources: Melody". The Recorder Magazine 25, no. 3 (Fall): 88–91.
Caravan, Ronald R. (1979). Preliminary Exercises and Etudes in Contemporary Techniques for Clarinet: Introductory Material for the Study of Multiphonics, Quarter Tones, and Timbre Variation. [Oswego, New York]: Ethos Publications.
Ellis, Don (1975). Quarter Tones: A Text with Musical Examples, Exercises and Etudes. Plainview, New York: Harold Branch
MacDonald, John (1822). A Treatise on the Harmonic System Arising from the Vibrations of the Aliquot Divisions of Strings According to the Gradual Progress of the Notes from the Middle, to the Remote Extremes: Explaining Simply, by Curved Delineations, the Manner in Which the Harmonic Tones, Half and Quarter Notes, Are Generated and Produced on Every Corresponding Part of the String; and under a Copious Explanatory Description Illustrated by Musical and Appropriate Plates, Giving an Easy and Familiar Adaptation of the Whole to the Purposes of Composition and Instrumental Music, and More Particularly, to the Practice of the Violin, Tenor, Violoncello and Double Bass, on All the Strings, and in Every Compass of These Instruments, by Every Practical Mode of Execution; with Some Musical Animadversions Introductory of the General Subject, Briefly Alluding to the Rise and Progress of Music, and to the Corrections of Temperament: and Stating Various Improvements of Instruments, Experimentally Ascertained: Concluding with an Application or Two of the Principle of Musical Notes, to Purposes of Utility, and a Reference to Terms Less Generally Noticed. London: Printed for the author, and sold by T. Preston.
Möllendorff, Willi, and Joe Monzo (2001). Music with Quarter-Tones: Experiences at the Bichromatic Harmonium. [United States]: J. Monzo.
Rees, Carla (2007). "Eva Kingma and the Quarter-Tone Flute". Pan: The Flute Magazine 26, no. 4:23–29.
Rewoldt, Todd (2000). "Altissimo Quarter-Tones for the Alto Saxophone". Saxophone Symposium 25:56–69.

External links
"quarter-tone / 24-edo", TonalSoft.com

Musical scales